Thomas Michael Nugent (born 11 July 1994) is an English cricketer. Nugent is a right-handed batsman who bowls right-arm fast-medium. He was born in Bath, Somerset.

Nugent made his debut for Hampshire in a List A fixture against Sri Lanka A at the Ageas Bowl in 2014. The match though was abandoned after 18 overs due to rain. Nugent bowled 4 overs finishing with figures of 1/15 having Bhanuka Rajapaksa caught by Michael Porter for 6.

Nugent has also played for Berkshire and has played First-class cricket for Loughborough MCCU making his debut against Nottinghamshire in April 2015.

References

External list
Tom Nugent at ESPNcricinfo
Tom Nugent at CricketArchive

1994 births
Living people
Cricketers from Somerset
English cricketers
Hampshire cricketers
Loughborough MCCU cricketers
Berkshire cricketers